Nambala Keshava Rao, commonly known by his nom de guerre Basavraj or Gaganna, is a Maoist Politician and General Secretary of the Communist Party of India (Maoist), currently on NIA's list of most wanted absconders.

He was the Chief of Party's Central Military Commission. In November 2018, he became the Supreme Commander of the Party after the resignation of Muppala Lakshmana Rao alias Ganapathy.

Early life
Rao hails from Jiyannapet village of Srikakulam district in Andhra Pradesh. He is a former kabaddi player, passed B.Tech from Regional Engineering College, now known as National Institute of Technology, Warangal. He was active in left wing student politics and attached with CPI-ML (People’s War). Rao was arrested only once in 1980 at Srikakulam when there was a clash between two students’ unions, Radical Students Union (RSU) and the RSS student wing Akhil Bharatiya Vidyarthi Parishad (ABVP). He owned no property in his name in his native village, which he left in the late 1970s.

Political life
Intelligence source said that Rao occupies strong military tactics in the form of guerrilla warfare and use of new forms of improvised explosive devices (IEDs). He is not only aggressive on field strategy but strongly committed to Marxism–Leninism–Maoism ideology. He was involved with the Naxalite movement since the 1970s. When the CPI (ML) Peoples War was formed in 1980 in Andhra Pradesh, he was one of the key organisers. He was the first commander to enter East Godavari and Visakhapatnam districts. Rao along with Mallojula Koteswara Rao alias Kishanji, Mallujola Venugopal and Malla Raji Reddy received training in the forests of Bastar from a group of former fighters of the Liberation Tigers of Tamil Eelam (LTTE) in ambush tactics and the handling of Gelatin in 1987. In 1992, he was elected a member of the Central Committee of the erstwhile Communist Party of India (Marxist–Leninist) People's War. In 2004, when the Communist Party of India (Maoist) (CPI(M)) was formed through the merger of Communist Party of India (Marxist-Leninist) People’s War and Maoist Communist Centre of India (MCCI), Rao was made the head of the Central Military Commission of the party as well as Politburo member having strength of his expertise in military tactics and use of explosives, especially use of IEDs. He is also suspected to be behind almost all the major Maoist attacks that have taken place in Chhattisgarh, Maharashtra and Odisha. According to police sources the killing of a Telugu Desam Party leader Kidari Saraveshwar Rao at Araku in Andhra Pradesh are attributed to him. A senior security official said that Rao alias Basavraj has been at the forefront in 2010 Maoist attack in Dantewada in which 76 CRPF soldiers were killed, the Jeeram Ghati attack in which 27 people, including former state minister Mahendra Karma and Chhattigarh Congress leader Nand Kumar Patel, were killed. He is the brain behind the outfit's attacks against security personnel and his promotion may see a spike in such incidents. National Investigation Agency announced a reward of Rs 10 lakh for Rao. He also popular in the name of Prakash alias Krishna alias Darapu Narasimha Reddy. On 10 November 2018, Rao has replaced Ganpathy as the new General Secretary of CPI (Maoist).

References

Anti-revisionists
Communist Party of India (Maoist) politicians
Indian guerrillas
Indian Marxists
Living people
Maoist theorists
Naxalite–Maoist insurgency
People from Srikakulam district
Andhra University alumni
Telugu people
Year of birth missing (living people)